The Vénus was a 32-gun frigate of the French Navy, lead ship of her class.

Career 
Vénus was launched in Saint-Malo in 1780. Under Captain Gouzillon de Bélizal, she patrolled between Île de Ré, Nantes and Brest and escorted convoys. In this capacity, she captured the British privateer Lord Amherst on 16 June 1781.

She was wrecked on 5 August 1781 near Glénan Islands, off Concarneau, when she ran aground due to a navigation error of the pilot. The crew was saved, but in spite of efforts to refloat her, she became a total loss.

Her guns were found in 1978, and are now on display in Concarneau.

Sources and references 
 Notes

Citations

References
 
 

External links
 Les bâtiments ayant porté le nom de Vénus, netmarine.net

1780 ships
Frigates of the French Navy
Ships built in France
Maritime incidents in 1781